Eupithecia strigatissima is a moth in the family Geometridae. It is found in Libya.

References

Moths described in 1927
strigatissima
Moths of Africa